Brent Edison (born 1956, Milnor, North Dakota) is an attorney and Democratic-NPL politician from North Dakota. He has unsuccessfully run for both State Auditor in 2004 and for State Tax Commissioner in 2006. Edison's campaign for Tax Commissioner was tarnished when it was publicized that he was fired from a state agency, Workforce Safety and Insurance, after reportedly creating a hostile work environment. Nonetheless, there was never a formal reason for Edison's dismissal, leading many to believe it was politically motivated. Indeed, Edison proved not to be the problem at WSI and unrest worsened dramatically after Edison's firing.

Edison is a native of Milnor. He graduated from North Dakota State University with a business degree and attended law school at the University of North Dakota. Currently, he lives in Bismarck and works as Disciplinary Counsel for the Disciplinary Board of the North Dakota Supreme Court and the state Judicial Conduct Commission.

Notes

University of North Dakota alumni
Living people
1956 births
North Dakota Democrats
People from Sargent County, North Dakota
North Dakota State University alumni